The Shire of Waranga was a local government area about  north of Melbourne, the state capital of Victoria, Australia.

History

Waranga was incorporated as a road district on 1 June 1863, and became a shire on 30 October 1865.

A large area was annexed to the Shire of Echuca on 10 October 1879, which later became known as the Shire of Deakin. The Shire of Rodney was severed and incorporated on 19 March 1886. On 16 May 1956, another loss of area occurred, when the Shire of Goulburn annexed some land in Waranga's southeast.

On 18 November 1994, the Shire of Waranga was abolished, and along with the City of Echuca, the Town of Kyabram, the Shires of Deakin and Rochester and some neighbouring districts, was merged into the newly created Shire of Campaspe. The Murchison district was transferred to the newly created City of Greater Shepparton.

Wards

Waranga was divided into four ridings on 5 May 1971, each of which elected three councillors:
 North Riding
 South Riding
 East Riding
 West Riding

Towns and localities

 Colbinabbin
 Corop
 Mathiesons
 Murchison
 Rushworth*
 Toolleen
 Whroo

* Council seat.

Population

* Estimate in the 1958 Victorian Year Book.

References

External links
 Victorian Places - Waranga Shire

Waranga